Stegen is a municipality in the Breisgau-Hochschwarzwald district, Baden-Württemberg, Germany.  It borders on the city of Freiburg, being about 8 km away as the crow flies, lying in the valley of the river Dreisam.  The municipality includes three population centres: the town of Stegen (which itself includes the villages of Weiler, Oberbirken, Unterbirken and Rechtenbach) and the villages of Eschbach and Wittental.

Economically, Stegen is partly an offshoot of Freiburg; for example, the Forest Zoology Institute of the University of Freiburg maintains a field station at Wittental.  It also plays a role in Black Forest tourism, with guest houses and other facilities catering to visitors.  It is the first town that a hiker on the Freiburg-Lake Constance Black Forest Trail passes through when travelling eastwards on the path from Freiburg.

References

Breisgau-Hochschwarzwald
Baden